Atenango may refer to:

Atenango del Río, Guerrero
Atenango del Río (municipality), Guerrero
San Agustín Atenango, Oaxaca
Atenango Mixtec language